Jakob Thomasius (27 August 1622 – 9 September 1684) was a German academic philosopher and jurist. He is now regarded as an important founding figure in the scholarly study of the history of philosophy. His views were eclectic, and were taken up by his son Christian Thomasius.

Work
Thomasius was influential in the contemporary realignment of philosophy as a discipline. Martin Mulsow writes:

He wrote on a wide range of topics, including plagiarism and the education of women.

He was the teacher of Gottfried Leibniz at the University of Leipzig, where Thomasius was professor of Rhetoric and Moral Philosophy, remaining a friend and correspondent, and has been described as Leibniz's mentor.

He is perhaps best remembered now as the author of the first published attack on Spinoza's Theological-Political Treatise.

Bibliography
Philosophia practica (1661)
Schediasma historicum (1665)
De foeminarum eruditione (1671) with Johannes Sauerbrei and Jacobus Smalcius
Praefationes sub auspicia disputationum suarum (1681)
Dissertationes ad stoicae philosophiae (1682)
Orationes (1683)

Notes

Further reading
Richard Sachse, Das Tagebuch des Rectors Jakob Thomasius, Leipzig 1894.

External links
 
 Mathematics Genealogy Project
 Thomasius' Neurotree profile
 
 
 Translation of Thomasius's critique of Spinoza

1622 births
1684 deaths
German philosophers
Heads of schools in Germany
17th-century German writers
17th-century philosophers
St. Thomas School, Leipzig teachers
17th-century German male writers